Ka Kha Ga Gha Umo (ক খ গ ঘ ঙ) is a 1970 Bangladeshi film directed by Narayan Ghosh Mita. Razzak and Kabari Sarwar plays the lead roles.

Cast 
 Razzak
 Kabori Sarwar
 AFM Abdul Ali Lalu

Shooting
The film's shooting began in Chuadanga, the hometown of cinematographer Baby Islam. The shooting took place for 20 days in a house named 'Setab Manzil' which was the maternal grandfather's house of Baby Islam. Actress Kabari had to stay there for a month for the shooting.  Later, people named the road in front of that house as 'Kabari Road'.  The road was officially recognised in that name by local administration in February 2017.

Music
The film's music has been composed by Altaf Mahmud and the songs were penned by Gazi Mazharul Anwar

"Aha Cholte Gele Choron" - Ferdousi Rahman
"Pagla Re Tui Bhober Reeti" - Altaf Mahmud
"Shaluk Shaluk Biler Jole" - Ferdousi Rahman
N/A - Abdul Jabbar
"Jodi Boli Jete Nahi Dibo" - Mohammad Ali Siddiqui and Sabina Yasmin
"Amar Jhumko Lotar Bajubondhe" - Ferdousi Rahman

References

External links

1970 films
1970s Bengali-language films
Bengali-language Pakistani films
Films directed by Narayan Ghosh Mita
Films scored by Altaf Mahmud